Kokatsura-ike Dam  is an earthfill dam located in Mie Prefecture in Japan. The dam is used for irrigation. The dam impounds about 1  ha of land when full and can store 80 thousand cubic meters of water. The construction of the dam was completed in 1895.

See also
List of dams in Japan

References

Dams in Mie Prefecture